Neverkinsky District is an administrative and municipal district (raion), one of the twenty-seven in Penza Oblast, Russia. It is located in the southeast of the oblast. Its administrative center is the rural locality (a selo) of Neverkino. Population: 16,329 (2010 Census);  The population of Neverkino accounts for 26.8% of the district's total population.

Geography

References

Notes

Sources

Districts of Penza Oblast